Tipula fascipennis is a species of true craneflies.

Distribution
Widespread throughout the West Palaearctic.  Flies from May to August.

Identification
See

References

 

Tipulidae
Diptera of Europe
Insects described in 1818